was a town located in Mitoyo District, Kagawa Prefecture, Japan.

As of 2005, the town had an estimated population of 9,952. The total area was 19.34 km².

On January 1, 2006, Mino, along with the towns of Nio, Saita, Takase, Takuma, Toyonaka and Yamamoto (all from Mitoyo District), was merger to create the city of Mitoyo and no longer exists as an independent municipality.

Mino had a sister city relationship with Evansville (Indiana), Unadilla (New York State), Sanyuan County in the city of Xianyang (Shaanxi China) and Florenville (Belgium).

The city of Mitoyo gets its name from the Mitoyo District which originally got half of its name from an older district called Mino District, and the other half from Toyota District (豊田郡).

History
March 16, 1899 - Mino District was dissolved by incorporating parts of it into the neighboring Toyota and Mitoyo Districts.
April 1, 1955 - Shimotakase Village, Omi Village, and Yoshizu Village were merged to create Mino Village.
September 1, 1961 - Renamed Mino Town.
January 1, 2006 - Mino was merged with 6 other towns to create Mitoyo City.

Education

The following were kindergarten, elementary, and junior high schools in the town. There were no high schools or secondary schools in Mino.
Shimotakase Kindergarten
Yoshizu Kindergarten
Omi Kindergarten
Shimotakase Elementary School
Yoshizu Elementary School
Omi Elementary School
Minotsu Junior High School

Transportation
 Shikoku Railway Company(JR Shikoku)
 Yosan Line
Mino Station
Tsushima no Miya Station - This station is only open for two days a year during the summer.  August 4 and August 5 from 8:00 AM to 3:30 PM. It was built in 1916.  The train schedule for this station is available from June to August only.
Highways
Expressway
Takamatsu Expressway - There is an on/off ramp in Mino, but only heading towards Takamatsu for the on-ramp and towards Matsuyama for the off-ramp.
National Highways
Route 11
Regional Highways
Route 21 - Marugame to Takuma to Kan'onji
Route 23 - Takuma to Kotohira
Route 48 - Zentsuji to Takuma
Local Routes
Route 220 Omi to Yoshizu to Nio
Route 221 Miyao to Takase
Route 222 Shimotakase to Takase

Famous Places and Events

 Fureai Park Mino
 Tsushima Jinja Shrine (津島神社) - Summer Festival
 Koueizan Honmonji Temple (Daibou)
Daibouichi - End of November Exhibition

Shikoku 88 Temple Pilgrimage
 Number 71 Iyadani Temple

Famous People From Mino
Kaname Jun (要潤)

Kento Momota (桃田 賢斗)

External links
 Official website of Mitoyo 

Dissolved municipalities of Kagawa Prefecture
Mitoyo, Kagawa